Plastiq Phantom is the musical alias of Darrin Wiener who records music ranging a wide variety of genres.  Plastiq Phantom first began releasing music in 1999 with the self-released CD-R Select Imputor? EP, which became the impetus for the formation of his own record label imputor?.

His debut full-length Enjoy The Art Of Lying Down was released in 2001 on the Seattle label Neverstop.  His self-titled second album was released October 19, 2004 by the imputor? label.

In addition to his own releases, Plastiq Phantom has been credited with production of many other acts including Vells, Psychic Emperor, Calculator Man & Hangar, Pleaseeasaur, and DJs On Strike!.

In 2004 Plastiq Phantom contributed music to the film Moog, about synthesizer guru Robert Moog.

In 2006, qp collaborated with comedy act Pleaseeasaur under the name American Sheriff.  Their debut release Long Arm of the Law was released by imputor? Records.

Wiener worked with Modest Mouse on their record Strangers to Ourselves contributing modular synthesizer, 303 Programming, Audio engineer, and sound design

Discography

As Plastiq Phantom
 Select Imputor? EP (1999, imputor?)
 Enjoy The Art Of Lying Down (2001, neverstop)
 Split Pink  7" (2002, imputor?)
 492 Cups To China  12" (2003, imputor?)
 Plastiq Phantom (2004, imputor?)
 Moog Original Soundtrack (2004, Hollywood Records) 
 Tubes 12" (2006, imputor?)
 yanpaintswallsoranger" (2011, imputor?)
 Two Theremins (2012, imputor?)
 The Blue Tape (2016, imputor?)

Collaborations
 World Gang - Drums 7" (2008, imputor?)
 World Gang - SLEEPTHROUGHJULYSPACE CAMPMORNINGCHANT (2008, imputor?)
 World Gang - Promise 1 (2011, imputor?)
 World Gang - Mechanic the Mushroom / Dolphin Smiles (2014, imputor?)
 Calculator Man & Hangar - It's Andersen, Not Anderson, Bytch! (2001, imputor?)
 DJs On Strike! - Something Fabulous For All The Bytches (2001, imputor?)
 DJs On Strike! - Too Hot For Solid Steel (2003, imputor?)
 DJs On Strike! - I'm So Happy EP (2004, imputor?)
 DJs On Strike! - I'm So Happy b/w Smells 12" Single (2004, imputor?)

Production, Technical & Musician Credits
 Modest Mouse - Strangers to Ourselves (2015, Epic)
 Modest Mouse - No One's First, and You're Next (2009, Epic)  
 Modest Mouse - Perpetual Motion Machine (2009, Epic) 
 Vells - Integretron (2007, imputor?)
 Psychic Emperor - Communication (2006, imputor?)
 Vells - Flight From Echo Falls (2004, imputor?)
 Psychic Emperor - Psychic Emperor (2004, imputor?)
 Dalmatians - Pop/Rock/Ruff Drafts (2004, imputor?)
 Pleaseeasaur - The Yellow Pages'' (2003, imputor?)

References

External links
 Official Plastiq Phantom Website
 Official imputor? Website
 Official World Gang Website

Musicians from Washington (state)
Living people
Year of birth missing (living people)